Stemodia is a genus of flowering plants in the family Plantaginaceae. The genus comprises approximately 40 species of annual and perennial herbs and shrubs which are distributed throughout temperate and tropical regions of Asia, Africa, Australia and the Americas.  This genus is sometimes placed in the families Scrophulariaceae or Gratiolaceae. The generic name is derived from the Latin word stemodiacra, which means "stamens with two tips." Twintip is a common name for several species.

Selected species

Gallery

References

External links

Plantaginaceae
Plantaginaceae genera